What's Your Number may refer to:

"What's Your Number?" (song), a 2004 single by Cypress Hill
What's Your Number?, a 2011 American comedy film